My Blue Heaven is a 1950 American drama musical film directed by Henry Koster and starring Betty Grable and Dan Dailey.

Plot

Kitty Moran (Betty Grable), a radio star, finds out she is pregnant. After she miscarries, Kitty and her husband Jack (Dan Dailey) move their show to television, and become determined to adopt a baby.

Cast
 Betty Grable as Kitty Moran
 Dan Dailey as Jack Moran
 David Wayne as Walter Pringle
 Jane Wyatt as Janet Pringle
 Mitzi Gaynor as Gloria Adams
 Una Merkel as Miss Irma Gilbert
 Louise Beavers as Selma
 Laura Pierpont as Mrs. Johnston
 Elinor Donahue as Mary – Bratty Autograph Seeker
 Phyllis Coates as Party Girl
 Mae Marsh as Maid
 Minerva Urecal as Mrs. Bates aka Old Mule Face
 Suzanne Ridgeway as Audience Member / Passerby on Street
 Barbara Pepper as Susan, Waitress

Background
My Blue Heaven was the third film that Grable and Dailey made together, the first two being Mother Wore Tights in 1947 and When My Baby Smiles at Me in 1948. They later co-starred in a fourth, Call Me Mister (1951).

My Blue Heaven marked the film debut of musical star Mitzi Gaynor.

Grable was reluctant to make the film. She only agreed to do it if Lamar Trotti rewrote the script and Henry Koster replaced Claude Binyon as director.

Radio adaptation
My Blue Heaven was presented on Lux Radio Theatre February 25, 1952. The one-hour adaptation featured Grable and Dailey in their roles from the film.

Notes
Jane Wyatt and Elinor Donahue later starred in the TV show Father Knows Best (1954–1960).

References

External links
 
 
 

1950 films
1950s musical drama films
20th Century Fox films
American musical drama films
1950s English-language films
Films about adoption
Films about entertainers
Films about television
Films directed by Henry Koster
Films produced by Sol C. Siegel
1950 drama films
1950s American films